12923 Zephyr is a stony asteroid, classified as potentially hazardous asteroid and near-Earth object of the Apollo group, approximately  in diameter. It was discovered on 11 April 1999, by astronomers of the Lowell Observatory Near-Earth Object Search at Anderson Mesa Station near Flagstaff, Arizona. The asteroid was named after the deity Zephyrus from Greek mythology.

Orbit and classification 

Zephyr orbits the Sun at a distance of 1.0–2.9 AU once every 2 years and 9 months (1,003 days). Its orbit has an eccentricity of 0.49 and an inclination of 5° with respect to the ecliptic. The body's observation arc begins with a precovery taken at Palomar Observatory in April 1955, almost 44 years prior to its official discovery observation at Anderson Mesa.

Close encounters 

This short distance as well as its sufficiently large size makes it a potentially hazardous asteroid.

Naming 

This minor planet was named after the god of the west wind, Zephyrus, from Greek mythology. The name was suggested by M. Smitherman. The official naming citation was published by the Minor Planet Center on 28 September 2004.

Physical characteristics 

In the SMASS classification, Zephyr is a common S-type asteroid. The body is also characterized as a stony asteroid by the Infrared Telescope Facility, and in the Tholen classification (noisy spectrum).

Rotation period 

In April 1999, a rotational lightcurve of Zephyr was obtained from photometric observations by Czech astronomer Petr Pravec at Ondřejov Observatory. Lightcurve analysis gave a well-defined rotation period of 3.891 hours with a brightness amplitude of 0.18 magnitude.

Diameter and albedo 

According to the survey carried out by the NEOWISE mission of NASA's Wide-field Infrared Survey Explorer and the ExploreNEOs survey of the Spitzer Space Telescope, Zephyr measures between 1.86 and 2.062 kilometers in diameter and its surface has an albedo between 0.1764 and 0.21.

The Collaborative Asteroid Lightcurve Link adopts Petr Pravec's revised WISE data, with albedo of 0.1764 and a diameter of 2.06 kilometers based on an absolute magnitude of 15.93.

Notes

References

External links 
 (12923) Zephyr at NEODyS-2
 Asteroid Lightcurve Database (LCDB), query form (info )
 Dictionary of Minor Planet Names, Google books
 Asteroids and comets rotation curves, CdR Observatoire de Genève, Raoul Behrend
 
 
 

012923
012923
Named minor planets
Earth-crossing asteroids
012923
19990411